Flight, Bremen 1961 is an album by the Jimmy Giuffre 3 recorded live at Sendesaal of regional public broadcaster Radio Bremen, Germany, on November 23, 1961. It was first released in 1993 by hatArt, and re-released by HatOLOGY (another imprint of Hathut Records) in combination with a previous recording from the same concert tour called Emphasis & Flight 1961 (2003).

Track listing
All songs written by Jimmy Giuffre unless otherwise noted.
 "Call of the Centaur" - 3:59
 "Postures" (Paul Bley) - 6:56
 "Sonic" - 5:21
 "Goodbye" (Gordon Jenkins) - 5:56
 "Stretching Out (Suite for Germany)" - 11:12
 "Cry, Want" - 7:34
 "Flight" - 5:39
 "That's True, That's True" - 8:39
 "Trance"  - 5:51
 "Whirrrr" - 2:31

Personnel
Jimmy Giuffre - clarinet
Steve Swallow - double bass
Paul Bley - piano

References

1993 live albums
Jimmy Giuffre live albums
Hathut Records live albums